Silke Lippok (born 31 January 1994) is a German swimmer. She competed at the 2012 Summer Olympics in the 200 m, 4 × 100 m and 4 × 200 m freestyle events and finished in 13th, 9th and 11th place, respectively. She won three European titles in these events in 2010–2012.

She is the daughter of Christine and Andreas Lippok; her father works in a taxi business. She started training in swimming at the age of five following her elder brother Nils.

References

External links
 

Living people
1994 births
Sportspeople from Pforzheim
German female freestyle swimmers
German female swimmers
World Aquatics Championships medalists in swimming
Swimmers at the 2012 Summer Olympics
Olympic swimmers of Germany
European Aquatics Championships medalists in swimming